The 2020 Drexler-Automotive Formula 3 Cup was the 39th Austria Formula 3 Cup season and the second Drexler-Automotive Formula 3 Cup season.

Teams and drivers
All Cup cars were built between 2008 and 2018, Trophy cars were built between 1992 and 2007, and Open class have more powerful engines.

Race calendar and results

Footnote

Championship standings

Standings for all competitions are shown below. There was no RAVENOL Formel 3 Cup classification for German drivers for this season.

Drexler-Automotive Formula 3 Cup

Drexler-Automotive Formula 3 Trophy